The Feraliminal Lycanthropizer is a fictional psychotechnographic machine invented by American writer David Woodard, whose 1990 pamphlet of the same title speculates on its history and purpose. The brief, anonymously published work describes a vibration referred to as "thanato-auric waves", which the machine electrically generates by combining three infrasonic sine waves (3 Hz, 9 Hz and 0.56 Hz) with tape loops of unspecified spoken text (two beyond the threshold of decipherability, and two beneath the threshold).

Woodard describes the machine as "a low frequency thanato-auric wave generator" that is "known for its use by the Nazis and for its animalizing effects on human subjects tested within measurable vibratory proximity". The machine creates violence and sexual desire, its essential function being "to trigger states of urgency and fearlessness and to disarmour the intimate charms of the violent child within. The Trithemean incantations richly pervading the machine’s aural output produce feelings of aboveness and unbridled openness." His use of the word disarmour concomitantly suggests military applications and evokes orgone.

The text is predicated on the idea that a mind-altering technology has for decades, at the behest of American intelligence during the Cold War, been withheld from scrutiny. Dispensing sensitive information in the interest of enhancing civilian life, the narrator shares his erstwhile classified notes along with those left by earlier researchers concerning a machine that can "set into motion the process of subtle change at the innermost loci of the DNA molecule."

Etymology
The name Feraliminal Lycanthropizer is composed of two portmanteau words. The first, Feraliminal, is a combination of the Latin ferus (wild animal) and limen (threshold), while the second, Lycanthropizer, combines the Ancient Greek root lycanthrope (werewolf) with a generic suffix, -izer, conferring agency. Together the words suggest something hidden that triggers wild or aggressive conduct.

Legacy and influence
Despite the pamphlet's brevity and obscurity, its story has acquired mythic overtones, and readers have since made attempts to replicate the Feraliminal Lycanthropizer or invoke its described "animalizing effects on human subjects tested within measurable vibratory proximity." The machine's neologistic name has thus appeared in conjunction with disparate music groups and artists.

Scientific and historical inconsistencies
Apart from its title and the term thanato-auric, other hitherto unknown coinages (nonce words) introduced in Woodard's text are, in order of appearance: Plecidic, aurotic, nucleopatriphobic and Eugenaestheticus. Moreover, journalistic coverage appears to have roundly debunked the myth of the machine.

According to Fortean Times:

In TechnoMage, a compendium of writings on technology and the occult, author Dirk Bruere relates, "The recording '... contains two infrasonic frequencies, 3hz and 9hz, which, combined, generate a lower, third frequency of 0.56hz.' They do not." Paranormal researcher Michael Esposito opines, "I’m not sure the Feraliminal Lycanthropizer is as effective as a woman leaning against the spin cycle of a Maytag."

See also

 Bioacoustics
 Wunderwaffe

References

1990 hoaxes
American speculative fiction
Fictional technology
Devices to alter consciousness
Urban legends